Omniverse is a real-time 3D graphics collaboration platform created by Nvidia. It has been used for applications in the visual effects and "digital twin" industrial simulation industries. Omniverse makes extensive use of the Universal Scene Description (USD) format.

References 

Graphics software
Nvidia software

External links 
https://www.nvidia.com/en-us/omniverse/